Tom Lennart Berggren (born 26 June 1942) is a Swedish curler.

Teams

Personal life
His son Niklas is a curler as well. He played for Sweden in four World Men's championships.

References

External links
 

Living people
1942 births
Swedish male curlers
Swedish curling champions